

History
The City of Alice originated from the defunct community of Collins, which was located three miles east.  Around 1880 the San Antonio and Aransas Pass Railway attempted to build a line through Collins.  The townspeople did not want to sell their land to the railroad company; consequently, the railroad site was moved three miles west, and in 1883 a depot called Bandana was established at its junction with the Corpus Christi, San Diego and Rio Grande Railway.  Bandana soon became a thriving cattle-shipping point, and application for a post office was made under the name |Kleberg in honor of Robert Justus Kleberg.  The petition was denied because a town named Kleberg already appeared on the post office list, so residents then chose the name Alice, in honor of Alice Gertrudis King Kleberg, Kleberg's wife and the daughter of Richard King.  The Alice post office opened for business in 1888, and within a few years the remaining residents of Collins moved to Alice.

The first school began in 1887 in the attic of the old Sedwick House.  In 1930, the Alice School Board contracted to build a school containing thirteen classrooms and a library. Classes in this facility first commenced in January 1931 as the new Alice High School located along 3rd Street. When Mr. William Adams celebrated his 88th birthday on January 3, 1933, a public announcement, based on unanimous vote of the school board paid homage to Mr. Adams for his many contributions to the city by renaming the school after him.  The School Board voted to change the name of the High School back to Alice High in 1969.  Construction of Alice High was completed in time for 1970 school year, and the first graduating class was in 1971.

After a long process, the William Adams High School building was torn down and replaced with a brand new building in 2009.  The school is now known as William Adams Middle School and serves students in the grades of 7 and 8.

Notable alumni 
 Marv Brown - Drafted in the 25th round (301st overall) by the Detroit Lions in 1953
 Robert Curl - 1996 Nobel Prize Winner and a chemistry professor at Rice University
 J. Frank Dobie - Professor at Cambridge University and the University of Texas, author, political activist, credited with helping to save the Longhorn Cattle from extinction

External links 
 Alice ISD
 Alice Coyotes website
 Alice High School Band Website

Alice, Texas
Schools in Jim Wells County, Texas
Former high schools in Texas